Claire Thompson (born January 28, 1998) is a Canadian women's ice hockey player with the Toronto section of the Professional Women's Hockey Players Association (PWHPA) and the Canadian national team. A graduate of Princeton University, she finished her career fifth in all-time points by a defenceman in Princeton Tigers history with a cumulative 87 points.

She made her debut for the Canada women's national ice hockey team in 2019 in a two-game series against the United States held in Pittsburgh, Pennsylvania. She won gold with Team Canada at the 2021 IIHF Women's World Championship.

Thompson made her Olympic debut at the 2022 Winter Olympics held in Beijing, China. She helped Canada win gold and was named a tournament all-star. At the 2022 Olympics, Thompson set the Olympic record for points by a defensemen in Olympic ice-hockey. She tallied 13 points on two goals and nine assists, shattering the previous record of nine.

Playing career

Hockey Canada
In August 2019, Thompson was named to Canada's Under-22/Development Team for a three-game series against the United States in Lake Placid, New York. Thompson made her debut for the Canada women's national ice hockey team in 2019 in a two-game series against the United States held in Pittsburgh, Pennsylvania. She was then selected to attend the 2020 Women's Hockey World Championships that were not held due to the COVID-19 pandemic. She was one of 28 players invited to Hockey Canada's Centralization Camp, which represents the selection process for the Canadian women's team that shall compete in Ice hockey at the 2022 Winter Olympics.

On January 11, 2022, Thompson was named to Canada's 2022 Olympic team. Thompson finished with the highest plus-minus rating of the Olympic tournament with +23.

University 
During her freshmen year with Princeton Tigers, Thompson skated in all 33 games finishing with 20 points on 6 goals and 14 assists; she was second in defence in scoring and the leading freshmen defender. She was also named to the ECAC All-Academic Team.

In her sophomore season, Thompson the Tigers' defence in scoring, earning 21 points on 9 goals and 7 assists in 33 games. She was selected for Second-Team All-Ivy, ECAC All-Academic Team, and was named an AHCA All-America Scholar.

After her junior year, Thompson finished third on the Princeton Tigers team in scoring, leading the defensemen with 28 points on 9 goals and 19 assists. She was sixth in the nation in points per game for a defenseman (0.85). The Tigers won the Ivy League championship this season. Thompson was selected for First-Team All-ECAC and First-Team All-Ivy League and was a finalist for ECAC Best Defenseman. Additionally, she was an Academic All-Ivy League selection, named to the ECAC All-Academic Team, and was an AHCA All-American Scholar.

In her senior season with the Tigers, Thompson captained the team to their first-ever ECAC Championship. The team was scheduled to play Northeastern University in the first round of the NCAA tournament; however, the tournament was cancelled by the NCAA due to COVID-19. Thompson led the team's defence in scoring, finishing the season with 23 points on 7 goals and 16 assists in 31 games. She was selected for Second-team All-Ivy, Third-team All-ECAC, ECAC All-Tournament team, a finalist for the ECAC Mandi Schwartz Student-Athlete of the Year, Academic All-Ivy honoree, ECAC All-Academic, and AHCA All-America Scholar. Additionally, Thompson was selected as Princeton's nominee for NCAA woman of the year and was also a finalist for Princeton Athletics' C. Otto Von Kienbusch Award for Top Senior Female Student Athlete.

Medical School 
In September 2022, Thompson entered NYU School of Medicine as a medical student.

Career statistics

Regular season and playoffs

International

Awards and honours
2017 ECAC All-Academic Team
2018 Second Team All-Ivy
2018 ECAC All-Academic Team
2018 AHCA All-America Scholar
2019 First Team All-Ivy
2019 First Team All-ECAC
2019 ECAC All-Academic Team
2019 AHCA All-America Scholar
2019 Academic All-Ivy League
2020 Second Team All-Ivy
2020 Third Team All-ECAC
2020 ECAC All-Academic Team
2020 AHCA All-America Scholar
2020 Academic All-Ivy League

References

1998 births
Living people
Ice hockey players at the 2022 Winter Olympics
Olympic ice hockey players of Canada
Medalists at the 2022 Winter Olympics
Olympic gold medalists for Canada
Olympic medalists in ice hockey
Princeton Tigers women's ice hockey players
Ice hockey people from Toronto